Hanna Öberg  (born 2 November 1995) is a Swedish biathlete.

Career
In 2017 she won the IBU Female Rookie of the Year Award for her World Cup debut season, with the male counterpart being awarded to her fellow Swede Sebastian Samuelsson. At the Pyeongchang 2018 Winter Olympics she won a surprising gold in the Individual, after four clean shootings. It was both the first victory and podium of her career, with her previous best being a fifth place in the world cup. She also claimed silver in the Relay, finished seventh in sprint, and fifth in both the mass start and the pursuit. Öberg repeated her Olympic success at the 2019 Biathlon World Championships on home snow in Östersund, where she again won the individual with a perfect shoot, having previously finished fourth in the sprint and fifth in the pursuit. She became the first female biathlete to win the individual World Championship title the year after taking the Olympic individual gold.

She was awarded the Svenska Dagbladet Gold Medal in early-December 2018. and the Jerring Award in January 2019. In June 2019, it was announced she had been awarded the Victoria Award.

Biathlon results
All results are sourced from the International Biathlon Union.

Olympic Games
3 medals (2 gold, 1 silver)

World Championships
11 medals (3 gold, 3 silver, 5 bronze)

*During Olympic seasons competitions are only held for those events not included in the Olympic program.
**The single mixed relay was added as an event in 2019.

World Cup

Individual podiums
 8 victories 
 27 podiums

Team podiums
5 victories 
19 podiums

Personal life
Hanna's younger sister Elvira Öberg is also a biathlete. Elvira won two silver medals at the 2022 Olympic Games in Beijing. 

Hanna Öberg was in a relationship with biathlete Jesper Nelin until 2020, and has been in a relationship with the sprint world champion, Martin Ponsiluoma since 2021.

References

Sources

External links

1995 births
Swedish female biathletes
Biathletes at the 2018 Winter Olympics
Biathletes at the 2022 Winter Olympics
Olympic biathletes of Sweden
Medalists at the 2018 Winter Olympics
Medalists at the 2022 Winter Olympics
Olympic medalists in biathlon
Olympic gold medalists for Sweden
Olympic silver medalists for Sweden
Living people
Biathlon World Championships medalists
People from Kiruna Municipality